

A

B

Ba

Ba

Bi

Bo

Bu

C

Ca

Ce

Ci

Co

Cu

References

External links
Schlumberger Oilfield Glossary

Underwater diving terminology
Underwater diving
Wikipedia glossaries using description lists